IIIS may refer to:
The Institute for Integrated and Intelligent Systems of Griffith University, Australia
The Institute for Interdisciplinary Information Sciences, Tsinghua University, China
Fairey Fox IIIS, aircraft